Rock Against Howard, Musicians Against the Liberal Government is an Australian compilation CD featuring anti-Coalition musicians, released in 2004. The project hoped to inspire young voters to turn out in federal elections that year to vote against then-Prime Minister John Howard, but Howard's party prevailed all the same.

Rock Against Howard was organised by Frenzal Rhomb guitarist Lindsay McDougall, when he realised every musician he knew felt the same way about Howard. McDougall told Daniel Johnson of The Age that "I wanted to get more and different music fans and acts in on the idea of Rock Against Howard, and it also adequately reflects my taste in music, because I've got a bunch of my favourite bands on here as well." The project was inspired by the American Rock Against Bush compilations, and takes on a similar format. All profits from album sales go to refugee charities through the Refugee Action Coalition, an ironic tribute to Howard's stance on asylum seekers.

The music on the release is politically oriented, with the first disk featuring previously released songs, and a disk of live and otherwise previously unreleased work on the second. The style of music varies widely, with punk rock, hip-hop, and even show tunes.

Track listing

Disc 1

Musicians Against the Liberal Government
 H-Block 101 - "Reason Why" - 2:40
 Bodyjar - "Is It A Lie?" - 2:33
 Something for Kate - "Best Weapon" - 4:50
 The Givegoods - "Collar to Colour" - 4:23
 David Bridie - "Nation (of the Heartless Kind)" - 4:33
 The City Lights - "A Big Star" - 2:55
 Peabody - "A Resurrected Man" - 3:5
 78 Saab - "Sound of Lies" - 4:26
 Even - "Sunshine Comes" - 3:2
 Sulo - "Wash" - 2:54
 The Anyones - "Gun Him Down" - 4:41
 Razel - "The Arse Song" - 3:35
 The Resin Dogs - "Rebel" - 3:40
 Youth Group - "Drown" - 4:16
 Frenzal Rhomb - "White World" - 1:32
 TISM - "The Phillip Ruddock Blues" - 7:9

Disc 2

Unreleased and Unreal
 Front End Loader - "4 Star Heritage Arsehole [live]" - 2:40
 The Herd - "Honest J" - 2:57
 The Drugs - "I Was a Teenage Voter" - 2:28
 Godnose - "At the End of the Day" - 2:59
 Unpaid Debt - "Call it a Day" - 3:27
 Little Johnny (aka Pauline Pantsdown) - "I'm Sorry!" - 3:32
 Toekeo - "John Howard Is a Filthy Slut" - 3:41
 Mindsnare - "To the Boil" - 2:32
 Bemon Other - "Keep on Raping in the Free World" - 1:12
 The Persian Rugs - "Half-wit" - 2:17
 Steve Townson and the Conscripts - "Tonight We Storm the Bastille" - 3:15
 Major - "Liar" - 4:5
 The Fauves - "Get Fucked" - 3:10
 The Reservations - "Calling Out I'm Through" - 2:55
 George's Bush - "Evil Little Man" - 4:17
 Eddie Perfect - "John Howard's Bitches" - 3:56
 The Thighblasters - "How'd You All Get to Be So Dumb?" - 1:44
 Too Green for Summer (featuring Senator Andrew Bartlett) - "I Don't Believe it" - 2:32

References

External links 

  archived from the original on 9 August 2004.

2004 compilation albums
2004 in Australia
Compilation albums by Australian artists
Political music albums by Australian artists
Rock albums by Australian artists